Laura Krantz (born 1978) is an American journalist, podcaster and author. She is the host of the podcast Wild Thing, was an editor at National Public Radio for ten years, has a series of illustrated children's books based on the podcast, and is a founding partner of the media company Foxtopus Ink. Her work has been covered extensively in the media including in the Los Angeles Times, FOX, The Atlantic, and The Washington Post. She graduated Whitman College in 2000.

Wild Thing 
As of 2022, Krantz's Wild Thing podcast has three seasons. The first season aired in 2018 begins with Krantz's surprising discover that she was related to anthropologist Grover Krantz, who was one of the world's foremost experts on the cryptozoological creature Bigfoot. The podcast began as her reluctant foray into understanding the cultural fascination with Sasquatch, as well as how the creature might have evolved and various attempts to track it down. Subsequent seasons explored the possibility of extraterrestrial life, and the viability of nuclear power.

Wild Thing received largely positive reviews and has 3,700 ratings on Apple with an average of 4.8 stars. Wild Thing has been adapted into several subsequent projects, including a children's podcast called The Search for Wild Thing on the children's podcast network Pinna. It has also been adapted into an illustrated middle-grade book series with Abrams Books.

References 

American journalists
American podcasters
1978 births
Living people